This is a list of meet results for USA Masters Diving between 1974 and 1979.

1974

Spring Nationals 

1974 National AAU Masters Indoor Diving Championships, June 14–15, 1974, San Angelo, Texas. Nate Holt, meet director. The Beginning.

Summer Nationals 

1974 National AAU Outdoor Masters Diving Championships, August 24–25, 1974, Raytown, MO. Tom Hairabedian, meet director.

1975

Spring Nationals 
1975 National AAU Masters Indoor Diving Championships, April 19–20, 1975, Seattle, WA. Bill Burgess, meet director.

Summer Nationals 
1975 National AAU Masters Outdoor Diving Championships, August 23–24, 1975, Clovis, CA. Bill McAlister, meet director.

1976

Spring Nationals 

1976 National AAU Masters Indoor Diving Championships, May 16–17, 1976, Ft. Lauderdale, FL. Ted Keller, meet director.

Summer Nationals 
1976 National AAU Masters Outdoor Diving Championships, Sept. 7-8, 1976, Lincoln, NE. Ed Craren, meet director.

1977

Spring Nationals 
1977 National AAU Masters Indoor Diving Championships, May 21–22, 1977, Long Beach, CA. John Riley, Jose Mone, meet directors.

Summer Nationals 
1977 National AAU Masters Outdoor Diving Championships, July 29–31, 1977, The Woodlands, TX. Rich Lawler, meet director.

1978

Spring Nationals 
1978 National AAU Masters Indoor Diving Championships, May 20–21, 1978, Indianapolis, IN. Jim Stevens, meet director. This was the first year for age group 21-24, for five year age brackets above age 50, and also for tower diving.

Summer Nationals 
1978 National AAU Masters Outdoor Diving Championships, August 26–28, 1978, Mission Viejo, CA. Frederick Fox, meet director. This was the first meet for tower and it was initially held in 15 year age groups up to 50, then 50 & up.

There was also a special open event, called the Grand Prix, consisting of 3 dives from the 1 meter, 3 dives from the 3 meter and 3 dives from the tower, with carry over from the tower event, if desired.

1979

Spring Nationals 
1979 National AAU Masters Indoor Diving Championships, May 26–27, 1979, Grand Rapids, Michigan. Jeff Alward, meet director.

Summer Nationals 
1979 National AAU Masters Outdoor Diving Championships, August 25–27, 1979, Irvine, California. Lyle Felderman, meet director.

References

http://www.mastersdiving.org/us_masters_diving_003.htm

Diving competitions in the United States